Lukas Eric Oliver Nilsson (born 16 November 1996) is a Swedish handball player for Rhein-Neckar Löwen and the Swedish national team.

He competed at the 2016 European Men's Handball Championship.

Club career

THW Kiel
On 20 January 2016 THW Kiel announced that Lukas Nilsson would be joining the club on a three-year deal starting on 1 July 2016. On 16 March 2018, his contract was extended until 2021.

References

External links

1996 births
Living people
Swedish male handball players
Ystads IF players
THW Kiel players
Rhein-Neckar Löwen players
Expatriate handball players
Handball-Bundesliga players
Swedish expatriate sportspeople in Germany
People from Ystad
Handball players at the 2016 Summer Olympics
Olympic handball players of Sweden
21st-century Swedish people